HariVijaya is a devotional literature composed by Shridhar Swami Nazarekar (1658-1729), a popular Marathi poet in the 17-18th century.

It literally means 'Victory to God Hari'.

References

Hindu texts
Marathi-language literature
Cultural history of India